Otis Milton Smith (February 20, 1922 – June 29, 1994) was the first African American justice on the Michigan Supreme Court and the General Counsel for General Motors.

Smith graduated from law school at The Catholic University of America in 1950, where he was a member of the first volume of the school's Law Review.

He then went to Flint, Michigan, where he engaged in private practice until 1957.  At that time he was appointed to the Michigan Public Service Commission. His reputation for fighting graft there earned him a nickname: "the man who shot Santa Claus."

From 1959 until 1961 Smith served as Michigan Auditor General.

He was appointed a justice of the Michigan Supreme Court in 1961 by Governor John Swainson He retained his seat in the 1962 election but lost re-election in 1966, and was then hired by General Motors.  He would rise to become vice-president and General Counsel. In 1968, Smith served as a presidential elector. In 1983, his portrait was dedicated at the Michigan Supreme Court.  A portrait also hangs in the admissions of The Catholic University of America, Columbus School of Law.

A scholarship in his name is administered by the Community Foundation for Southeast Michigan.  It is given to a single mother, and can be used for tuition at Wayne State University, any campus of the University of Michigan, or the law school at The Catholic University of America.

See also
List of African-American jurists

Sources
Michigan Supreme Court Historical Society
Flint Public Library
Michigan Bar Journal
1990 interview with Roger F. Lane

Endnotes

1922 births
1994 deaths
African-American judges
African-American lawyers
Michigan Auditors General
Justices of the Michigan Supreme Court
Politicians from Memphis, Tennessee
Michigan state court judges
Michigan lawyers
Columbus School of Law alumni
1968 United States presidential electors
20th-century American judges
20th-century American politicians
20th-century American lawyers
20th-century African-American politicians